Tom Gloy (born June 11, 1947 in Lafayette, California) is a former driver in the CART Championship Car series.  He raced in the 1980 and 1984 seasons, with six career starts, including the 1984 Indianapolis 500.  Despite competing in only three events in 1980, he finished 14th in points, a result of finishing each race in the top ten.

In 1979, Gloy won the Formula Atlantic Series Championship.  In 1985, he competed in the IROC series as the representative from Sports Car Club of America (SCCA), earned by winning the 1984 Trans-Am Championship.

He owned a team in NASCAR's Craftsman Truck Series from 1997 to 1999.  The team often fielded trucks for veterans of the Trans Am series.  Gloy was later president of Blair Racing, which fielded a Dallara-Chevrolet driven by Alex Barron for the IRL IndyCar Series in 2002.

Motorsports Career Results

American Open-Wheel

Champ Car
(key) (Races in Bold indicate pole position)

 New Points system introduced in 1981

External links

Tom Gloy at Driver Database

Living people
1947 births
People from Lafayette, California
Racing drivers from California
Indianapolis 500 drivers
Champ Car drivers
Atlantic Championship drivers
Trans-Am Series drivers
International Race of Champions drivers
European Formula Two Championship drivers
NASCAR team owners

Team Penske drivers